Run is the sixth studio album by Japanese rock band B'z. Run debuted with 1,190,380 copies sold in its first week and over 2,196,660 copies sold in total.

The album continues the band's change in direction from a synthesizer-heavy band to a more guitar-oriented band. A full horn section replaced the synth brass backing, and electric organ was used more extensively. The resulting sound was not unlike many American bands, particularly Aerosmith, one of lead singer Koshi Inaba's inspirations.

Only one single, "Zero," was released.

Track listing 
 The Gambler - 5:27
 Zero - 4:50
  - 4:59
 Run - 3:53
 Out Of Control - 3:55
 Native Dance - 4:45
 Mr. Rolling Thunder - 4:34
 Sayonara Nanka wa Iwasenai (さよならなんかは言わせない) - 4:29
 Gekkou (月光) - 5:33
 Baby, You're My Home - 4:04

Certifications

References 
 B'z albums at the official site

1992 albums
B'z albums
Japanese-language albums